Worm War I is an Atari 2600 game written by David Lubar and published by 20th Century Fox in 1982. It's a hybrid fixed shooter and vertically-scrolling game.

Gameplay
The game plays like a fixed shooter, with the player controlling a tank firing at giant worms. The tank auto scrolls up as the worms and blocks move down. Every time all the worms are wiped out, a new set spawns at the top of the screen. The pagoda can be shot to clear all the worms or rammed into by the tank to receive a fuel bonus.  There are 99 waves with each wave starting with one worm with six at the end of the wave.

References

Other sources

External links
Worm War I at Atari Mania

1982 video games
Atari 2600 games
Atari 2600-only games
Fox Video Games games
Tank simulation video games
Vertically scrolling shooters
Video games developed in the United States